Gilles Simon (born 27 December 1984) is a French former professional tennis player. He had a career-high ATP singles ranking of world No. 6 attained on 5 January 2009. He turned professional in 2002 and won 14 singles titles on the ATP Tour.

Personal life 
Gilles Simon was born in Nice but grew up in Fontenay-sous-Bois, outside Paris. His nickname is "Gilou". His mother is a doctor. His father works for an insurance company. Gilles has a brother.

Supported by his parents, he started playing tennis at the age of six. Owing to a growth delay that runs in the family, he was shorter than most children of his age during his early teenage years. This is the reason he cites Michael Chang as a major influence, as his comparatively small frame proved that size was not the only factor in playing tennis.

Simon and his wife have two sons, born in 2010 and 2013.

Simon has admitted to liking to play video games, especially Virtua Tennis, as a hobby.

Career

Early career: 2002–2005 
Simon began his professional tennis career in the summer of 2002, competing at multiple Futures tournaments in France before playing in tournaments outside the country of his birth. His first Futures title came in Lisbon, Portugal, in June 2003, and he reached the quarterfinals of three other tournaments. He then captured his second title in Jamaica in September. During 2004, he saw three wins in France and another in Algeria.

Simon made his ATP tour debut in Metz, France in October 2004 as a 19-year-old.

In January 2005, he won his first ATP Challenger hard court tournament in Nouméa, New Caledonia, and defended it the following year. Ranked as world no. 113, Simon made his Grand Slam debut at the 2005 French Open, losing in the first round to Olivier Patience in four sets.

2006: Reaching the Top 50 
Simon competed at the first grand slam of the year, the Australian Open, where he beat Nicolás Massú and Tomáš Berdych before being defeated by No. 13 Thomas Johansson in the third round. After his result in the tournament, he broke into the top 100 for the first time, climbing to no. 89.

The Frenchman reached his first ATP Tour final in Valencia with wins over Andreas Seppi in the quarterfinal and Fernando Verdasco in the semifinal, but lost to Nicolás Almagro. He also made it to the semifinals in Casablanca, as well as the round of 16 in both the ATP Masters Series tournaments in Monte Carlo and Hamburg. At the end of the year Simon was ranked 45th in the world.

2007: First & Second ATP titles 
At the beginning of the year, Simon won his first ATP title at the Open 13 in, Marseille, France. En route to the final, Simon beat Lleyton Hewitt, Jonas Björkman, and Robin Söderling. In the final, Simon defeated Marcus Baghdatis.

In September, he won his second title of the year and of his career at the BCR Open Romania in Bucharest, Romania. He defeated Victor Hănescu in the final He broke into the top 30 for the first time on November 5 and finished the year as no. 29 in the world. By the end of the year, his career record against top-10 players was 4–5.

2008: Reaching the top 10 
Simon reached the quarterfinals in Marseille, defeating world no. 3 Novak Djokovic, in the second round. He reached the semifinals in Rotterdam the next week.

In May, he entered Casablanca as a qualifier due to his late entry to the tournament, even though his ranking was high enough to be seeded. Simon went on to win the tournament, defeating Julien Benneteau in the final. After his third-round loss to countryman Richard Gasquet at Wimbledon, Simon left Europe for the United States to familiarize himself with the hard courts before the U.S. Open Series. He won the Indianapolis Tennis Championships and hit a career-best no. 25.

The following week, he competed at the Rogers Cup in Toronto, including a win over world no. 1 Roger Federer in the second round, before losing in the semifinals to German veteran Nicolas Kiefer. This resulted in an entry into the top 15, three ranks behind the French no. 1, Richard Gasquet.

Simon participated in the 2008 Summer Olympics in Beijing, playing in the singles for France alongside Paul-Henri Mathieu, Michaël Llodra, and Gaël Monfils. He played doubles with Monfils, but lost in the first round to the Indian team of Bhupathi and Paes. In singles the Frenchman reached the third round before falling to James Blake.

At the US Open, Simon was seeded number 16. On day 6, he lost in the third round to the 17th seed Juan Martín del Potro, in a five-set match that lasted 3 hours and 47 minutes.

On September 14, Simon won his third title of the year and fifth ATP title, defeating Carlos Moyà at the 2008 BCR Open Romania. Simon entered the 2008 Madrid Masters the following month, defeating no. 11 James Blake and no. 14 Ivo Karlović to reach the semifinals. In the semifinals, he defeated world no. 1 Rafael Nadal in three sets, in a match that lasted 3 hours and 23 minutes. Simon lost the final to world no.4 Andy Murray in straight sets. The tournament boosted Simon to a career-high world no. 10, displacing Richard Gasquet as French no. 1. By the end of 2008, France had four players in the top 20 (Simon, Tsonga, Gasquet, and Monfils), for the first time since computer rankings were established in 1973. The French paper L'Equipe grouped the four player as néo-Mousquetaires. French TV Canal+ went on to produce a documentary series that followed the four French players and their touring around the world. The series "Les 4 Mousquetaires" went on the air for two seasons during 2009 and 2010.

On November 3, he qualified for the Tennis Masters Cup, a tournament usually reserved for the world's top eight players in Shanghai, after Rafael Nadal withdrew due to knee complications and fatigue. He was drawn in the red group with Roger Federer, Andy Murray, and Andy Roddick. In his first round-robin match, he beat defending champion Federer. Simon lost to Murray in his next match, but followed it with a victory over Radek Štěpánek, who replaced the injured Roddick. After Murray defeated Federer in the final round-robin match, Simon qualified for the semifinals, where he lost to world no. 3 Novak Djokovic in three sets. After this, he achieved a career high of world no. 7.

In December, he played in the newly formed Masters France exhibition tournament for the eight French players who had performed best at the four French tournaments. He qualified from the round-robin group stage with victories against Julien Benneteau, Marc Gicquel, and Josselin Ouanna. In the final against Michaël Llodra, Llodra pulled out with a shoulder injury, resulting in Simon's becoming the inaugural winner of the tournament.

2009: Australian Open quarterfinal 

Simon started the year off rising to a new career high of world no. 6 and played at the Hopman Cup, teaming up with compatriot Alizé Cornet to form the French mixed doubles duo.

Simon played at the first grand slam of the year, the 2009 Australian Open, as the sixth seed, where he reached the quarterfinals before losing to world no. 1 Rafael Nadal.

He participated in the Davis Cup with other French team members Michaël Llodra, Jo-Wilfried Tsonga, and Richard Gasquet. The team competed against the Czech Republic from 6–8 March. Simon lost to Tomáš Berdych, and then played Radek Štěpánek (whom his fellow team member Tsonga beat). Simon lost to Štěpánek, which gave the Czechs a 3–1 lead, and France was out of the Davis Cup in the first round for the first time since 2000.

He went into the Sony Ericsson Open in Miami ranked no. 7 in the world. He reached the fourth round before losing to Jo-Wilfried Tsonga.

Simon played at the Estoril Open as the top seed, before losing to Albert Montañés, in the third round. He competed with fellow players Jo-Wilfried Tsonga and Jérémy Chardy, forming the French team at the ARAG World Team Cup in Düsseldorf. He lost to Robin Söderling and Rainer Schüttler.

He entered Roland Garros as the seventh seed and reached the third round, losing to Victor Hănescu. During the match, he injured his right knee. Although he finished the match, the injury developed into a chronic issue. At Wimbledon, Simon reached the fourth round where he lost to unseeded Spaniard Juan Carlos Ferrero.

During the 2009 US Open Series, he played at the 2009 Rogers Cup where he lost to Jo-Wilfried Tsonga in the third round. One week later, he played at the 2009 Western & Southern Financial Group Masters and Women's Open in Cincinnati, where he defeated Nikolay Davydenko en route to the quarterfinals, where he would lose to world no. 4 Novak Djokovic. At the 2009 US Open, Simon equalled his best result of third round before retiring with a right knee injury during his third-round match against Juan Carlos Ferrero. Simon then won his first title of 2009 at the 2009 PTT Thailand Open, defeating Viktor Troicki in the final.

Simon returned to France to play in Lyon and lost in the semifinal to Michaël Llodra. At the next tournament in Valencia, he lost to Mikhail Youzhny in the quarterfinal. He continued to Bercy to play at the BNP Paribas Masters. He was seeded 11th and had a first-round bye. In the second round, he faced Ivan Ljubičić. While lunging to return a wide serve, he aggravated a right knee injury that has been bothering him for half of the 2009 season. Although with his movement severely hampered, Simon decided to play on to finish the match in front of an enthusiastic home crowd. He went on to win the match. In an interview during the Paris tournament, Simon said that the doctor had recommended that he take at least two months to recover from his knee injury.

2010: Seventh ATP title 
Gilles started the 2010 season with an exhibition event, the World Tennis Challenge in Adelaide. It started badly for him, as he struggled with injury. He lost three straight matches, including to the home favourite Bernard Tomic. Simon pulled out of the Australian Open due to his knee injury. He did not make any appearances in the 2010 season until mid-February, at the 2010 Open 13 tournament in Marseille, losing in the first round.

The right knee injury eventually caused Simon to miss the entire spring European clay season, including the French Open. He returned to the tour in mid-June, winning two rounds in Eastbourne before losing to Michaël Llodra in the quarterfinals. At the 2010 Wimbledon tournament Simon reached the third round. He began the summer US hard court season by participating in the Legg Mason Tennis Classic in Washington, D.C. reaching the quarterfinals. However, he suffered first-round defeats in his next two ATP Masters 1000 series tournaments, the 2010 Rogers Cup in Toronto and the 2010 Western & Southern Financial Group Masters and Women's Open in Cincinnati. He moved on to New York to take part in US Open, reaching the third round. He went on to meet the no. 1 player Rafael Nadal in the third round. Before the match, upon hearing about the birth of Simon's son, Nadal jokingly offered to buy Simon a flight ticket back to Europe to see his son before the match. Simon stayed, and lost to the eventual champion Nadal.

Simon then entered 2010 Open de Moselle as a wildcard. Originally, he did not plan to play the tournament because his son was supposed to be due that week. He took his newly extended family to Metz and eventually won the tournament by beating Mischa Zverev in the final. This was his seventh career title, coming only weeks after the birth of his first child. During the award ceremony, he thanked his girlfriend for the support and called the victory a "family effort."

The rest of 2010 was more ups and downs, indicating that after returning from the serious knee injury, he was still struggling to find his consistency. He went on to participate in two Asian tournaments. He beat Sam Querrey and Michael Berrer to reach the quarterfinals of the China Open in Beijing, but lost to Djokovic. He then lost in the first round of the Shanghai Masters to Stanislas Wawrinka. After Asia, he returned to France to play Open Sud de France in Montpellier, where he reached the quarterfinals. The next tournament was the Valencia Open 500, where Simon beat two seeds (Fernando Verdasco and Nikolay Davydenko) en route to his semifinal appearance, only to lose to the Spanish qualifier Marcel Granollers. 

In December 2010, Simon was picked to play the Davis Cup final for France, which was hosted in Belgrade, Serbia. The final was filled with controversies over which player was to be called on to play each match. France called on Simon to play Novak Djokovic in day 1, while others were expecting Michaël Llodra to play, based on Llodra's good form in the BNP Paribas Masters (including beating Djokovic in two sets). Simon lost the match in three sets. When France won the doubles and led 2–1 going into day 3, the French team seemed to be on its way to yet another Davis Cup victory. But day 3 opened with Djokovic in strong form defeating Monfils in three easy sets, leaving the championship to a deciding fifth match. The schedule originally stated that the fifth match was to be played by Janko Tipsarević and Simon. Last-minute replacement saw both replaced by their teammates Viktor Troicki and Michaël Llodra respectively. The fifth match ended in anticlimactic fashion with an overwhelming victory for Troicki in three sets. Serbia won the Davis Cup for the first time in history. France's defeat caused some to question the choice of Llodra to play Troicki when Simon has a 4–0 head-to-head record against the Serb. Nevertheless, everyone agreed that Troicki and the Serbian team had displayed convincing performances over their French opponent, and the victory was well deserved.

2011: Eight & Ninth ATP titles 
Simon started his 2011 campaign by entering three tournaments in Australia: Brisbane, Sydney, and the 2011 Australian Open. He lost in the first round of Brisbane to Santiago Giraldo. One week later, he beat Alexandr Dolgopolov and Ernests Gulbis in the quarterfinals and semifinals and then captured his eighth title by defeating Viktor Troicki, in the final of the Sydney International. In the Australian Open, he lost to Roger Federer in the second round in a five set match. Simon went on to defeat Nicolás Almagro in Hamburg, capturing the most important title of his career in terms of ATP rankings.

Simon reached the fourth round of Roland Garros but lost to Robin Söderling. At Wimbledon, he lost to Juan Martín del Potro in the third round.

At the US Open, he advanced to the fourth round by defeating Ricardo Mello, Guillermo García-López, and Juan Martín del Potro before losing to John Isner.

2012: Tenth ATP title, Two Masters 1000 semifinals 
Simon started his season at the Brisbane International, where he made the semifinals before losing to Alexandr Dolgopolov. At the 2012 Australian Open, Simon went out in the second round to his countryman Julien Benneteau.

He made the semifinals of the Open Sud de France and the quarterfinals at Indian Wells, where he went down against John Isner. In Miami, he was defeated by Andy Murray in the fourth round.

Simon reached the semifinals at the Monte Carlo Rolex Masters, defeating Janko Tipsarević and Jo-Wilfried Tsonga in the third round and quarterfinals, respectively. He lost in the semifinals to champion Rafael Nadal. Subsequently, he won the tournament in Bucharest, Romania, defeating Fabio Fognini in the final.

At the Masters 1000 event in Madrid, he lost in the third round to Janko Tipsarević. In Rome, he lost to David Ferrer in the third round. At the French Open he lost in the third round to Stanislas Wawrinka in five sets. At Wimbledon he lost in the second round to Xavier Malisse. He fell in the third round of the US Open to Mardy Fish.

He made the semifinals at Paris Bercy Masters where he lost to qualifier and eventual runner-up Jerzy Janowicz to close the year.

2013: Eleventh ATP title 
He started off the season once again at the Brisbane International where he lost in the quarterfinals to Marcos Baghdatis. At the 2013 Australian Open, he reached the fourth round before losing to Andy Murray. He also made it to the fourth round of the French Open, before losing to Roger Federer in five sets. At Wimbledon he lost in the first round to Feliciano Lopez. He missed the US Open due to illness.

In September, he won the Moselle Open for his 11th career title, beating Jo-Wilfried Tsonga in the final in straight sets.

2014: Late resurgence, Second Masters 1000 Final in Shanghai 
Simon began his season at the Brisbane International with a shocking loss to world no.147 Marius Copil in the first round. He lost to Jo-Wilfried Tsonga in the third round of the 2014 Australian Open after beating both Daniel Brands (saved seven match points) and Marin Cilic in five sets.

He lost to Andy Murray despite taking the first set and serving for the match in the second at 5–3 in the quarterfinals of the 2014 Abierto Mexicano Telcel. At the Rome Masters, Simon pushed World no.1 Rafael Nadal in three sets. He made to semifinals of the 2014 Open de Nice Côte d'Azur before falling to Federico Delbonis.

Simon made back-to-back grand slam third rounds in 2014 French Open and 2014 Wimbledon Championships. At the 2014 US Open, he pull off an upset against world no.5 David Ferrer in reach the fourth round, where he was defeated by eventual champion Marin Cilic in five sets. Simon reached the final of the 2014 Shanghai Rolex Masters, upsetting Stan Wawrinka, Tomas Berdych and Feliciano Lopez. He lost to Roger Federer in two tight tiebreak sets.

2015: 12th ATP title, Wimbledon quarterfinal & return to the top 10
Simon started 2015 slowly, losing to James Duckworth in Brisbane. He made the third round of the 2015 Australian Open, where he was defeated by David Ferrer. He reached the quarterfinals of the 2015 Open Sud de France, losing to Jerzy Janowicz. He then snapped his 12-match losing streak against Andy Murray in the quarterfinals of the 2015 ABN AMRO World Tennis Tournament. However, he was defeated by Tomas Berdych in the semifinals. A week later, he won his second title at the Open 13 tournament in Marseille by defeating compatriot Gael Monfils.

He reached the fourth round at Roland Garros, losing to eventual champion Stan Wawrinka in straight sets. He later reached his second grand slam quarterfinal at Wimbledon, defeating Monfils and Berdych before losing to Roger Federer.

In September, he made the final of the Moselle Open, where he was denied a third title at the tournament in a hard-fought final by Jo-Wilfried Tsonga, who took his third title at the tournament instead.

2016: 400th win and semifinalist in Shanghai

Simon, seeded no. 5, lost in the first round of the World Tour 250 Series event in Brisbane to unseeded Grigor Dimitrov to start the year. Simon competed in the Australian Open, where he fell to World No. 1 Novak Djokovic in the 4th round, following a straight sets win against Federico Delbonis in the 3rd round. In March, Simon lost in the quarterfinals of the Miami Open to David Goffin, having beaten world no. 11 Marin Čilić in the third round. He lost in the 3rd round of the Masters 1000 events in Monte Carlo and Madrid to Stan Wawrinka and Andy Murray respectively. Simon lost to Viktor Troicki in the 3rd round of the French Open. That was the last ATP World Tour clay court tournament of the first half of the year.

Unlike the first five months of the year, the grass court season did not yield much success for Simon. Two grass-court warmup tournaments, Stuttgart and Queen's Club, saw premature defeats, both to much lower-ranked opponents. Simon, seeded no. 16, lost in the second round of Wimbledon to Grigor Dimitrov. After losing in the 3rd round to Rafael Nadal at the Olympics, Simon (seeded no. 30) fell to Italian Paolo Lorenzi at the US Open in the second round. Simon, seeded no. 4, lost to top seed Dominic Thiem in the semifinals of the Moselle Open. 
At the Shanghai Masters, the unseeded Simon upset no. 3 seed Stan Wawrinka in the third round for his 400th career match win before losing in the semifinals to Andy Murray in straight sets – it was one of the last matches of the year that Murray played as the world no. 2 before he became world no. 1 three weeks later on 7 November. Simon played his last ATP World Tour tournament of the year at the Paris Masters, where he upset no.10 seed Roberto Bautista Agut in the second round before losing to no.7 seed Tomáš Berdych in the third round.

2017: Finished outside the Top 50 for the first time since 2005
At the Australian Open, Simon (seeded no. 25) fell one round short of matching the previous year's performance, bowing out in the third round to no. 3 seed and eventual quarter-finalist Milos Raonic.

For the whole of 2017, he managed to progress beyond the round of 16 of the singles main draw in only two ATP World Tour tournaments – in Marseille (lost in the quarterfinals to Jo-Wilfried Tsonga) and Lyon (lost in the quarterfinals to Tomáš Berdych). At the Shanghai Masters, the unseeded Simon upset no. 8 seed and world no. 10 David Goffin in the second round before losing to unseeded compatriot Richard Gasquet in the third round. 
Simon managed just a 16–25 singles win–loss record and finished the year outside the Top 50 of the ATP singles rankings for the first time since 2005.

2018: Two ATP singles titles & first doubles final

In the opening week of the 2018 ATP World Tour, Simon won his 13th career ATP World Tour singles title and his first since the 2015 Open 13 in Marseille by defeating each of the top 3 seeds in the ATP World Tour 250 series tournament in Pune, India; he beat defending champion and third seed Roberto Bautista Agut in the second round, top seed Marin Čilić (ranked world No. 6 in the ATP singles rankings) in the semi-finals and Kevin Anderson in the final. Simon also reached his first career ATP World Tour doubles final in Pune; he and his French partner Pierre-Hugues Herbert lost in the doubles final to Robin Haase and Matwé Middelkoop. On 8 January (the first Monday after the end of the Pune tournament), Simon's ATP singles ranking and ATP doubles ranking improved from world no. 89 (7 days earlier) to no. 57 and from world no. 824 (7 days earlier) to no. 300 respectively. Simon lost his first round match against Jared Donaldson in straight sets in his next tournament, at the Sydney International. At the Australian Open, he was forced to retire from his second round match when he was trailing 2–6, 0–3 against the no. 10 seed Pablo Carreño Busta because of an injury to his left thigh muscles that he had sustained the week before in Sydney.

In the final of the Lyon Open against Dominic Thiem, Simon won the first set 6–3 and failed to convert a break point while leading 4–2 in the second set; that was the turning point of the match and Thiem recovered to defeat Simon 3–6, 7–6(7–2), 6–1.

Simon won his 14th ATP Tour singles title of his career in Metz, defeating Matthias Bachinger in the final.

2019: Second ATP final on grass

Simon started his 2019 season at the Chennai Open. Seeded third and the defending champion, he reached the semifinals where he lost to top seed and world No. 6, Kevin Anderson, in a rematch of the final last year. Seeded fourth at the Sydney International, he made it to the semifinals where he was defeated by fifth seed, last year finalist, and eventual champion, Alex de Minaur. Seeded 29th at the Australian Open, he suffered a second-round loss at the hands of Australian wildcard Alex Bolt.

In February, Simon competed at the Open Sud de France. Seeded fourth, he lost in the second round to compatriot and eventual champion, Jo-Wilfried Tsonga. Getting past qualifying at the Rotterdam Open, he was eliminated in the first round by 2014 champion Tomáš Berdych. Seeded sixth and two-time champion at the Open 13, he reached the quarterfinals where he was beaten by third seed and world No. 24, David Goffin. In March, he played at the Indian Wells Masters. Seeded 27th, he lost in the third round to seventh seed, world No. 8, and eventual champion, Dominic Thiem. Seeded 23rd at the Miami Open, he was defeated in the second round by compatriot Jérémy Chardy.

Simon started his clay-court season at the Grand Prix Hassan II in Marrakesh. Seeded fourth, he reached the semifinals where he lost to three-time champion Pablo Andújar. At the Monte-Carlo Masters, he withdrew from his second-round match against 13th seed and world No. 18, Fabio Fognini, due to a back injury. Seeded 11th at the Barcelona Open, he lost in the second round to Mackenzie McDonald. In Madrid, he fell in the first round to qualifier Hugo Dellien. At the Italian Open, he lost in the first round to Philipp Kohlschreiber. Seeded 26th at the French Open, he was defeated in the second round by Italian qualifier Salvatore Caruso.

Simon started his grass-court season at the Stuttgart Open. He lost in the second round to seventh seed, world No. 21, and eventual finalist, Félix Auger-Aliassime.

2020: Fifth semifinal at the Open 13, struggles in COVID season

Simon started his 2020 season by representing France at the first edition of the ATP Cup. France was in Group A alongside Chile, Serbia, and South Africa. France defeated Chile 2-1. France lost to Serbia 1-2. In the final tie, he beat Lloyd Harris of South Africa. Despite his win over Harris, France lost the final tie to South Africa 1-2. In the end, France ended third in Group A. At the Adelaide International, he lost in the first round to compatriot Jérémy Chardy. Ranked 61 at the Australian Open, he was eliminated in the second round by 23rd seed, world No. 26, and Australian Nick Kyrgios.

After the Australian Open, Simon competed at the Open Sud de France. He lost in the first round to compatriot and four-time champion, Richard Gasquet. In Rotterdam, he was beaten in the second round by third seed, world No. 9, compatriot, defending champion, and eventual champion, Gaël Monfils. At the Open 13 in Marseille, he upset top seed and world No. 5, Daniil Medvedev, in the quarterfinals to reach the semifinals for the fifth time in his career. He lost in his semifinal match to seventh seed and world No. 18, Félix Auger-Aliassime. He has won 29 matches at the tournament (29–11), more triumphs than he has earned at any other event. The ATP tour canceled all tournaments from March through July due to the Coronavirus pandemic.

When the ATP resumed tournament play in August, Simon played at the Western & Southern Open. This event normally took place in Cincinnati, Ohio, but was held at the USTA Billie Jean King National Tennis Center in New York City, United States, in order to reduce unnecessary player travel by centralizing the tournament and the subsequent US Open in the same venue. He lost in the final round of qualifying to American Sebastian Korda. Ranked 52 at the US Open, he was defeated in the second round by 19th seed and world No. 25, Taylor Fritz.

After the US Open, Simon competed at the Open du Pays d'Aix, an ATP Challenger tournament in Aix-en-Provence, France. As the top seed, he was ousted from the tournament in the first round by Federico Gaio. At the Italian Open, he lost in the second round of qualifying to Dominik Koepfer. At the Hamburg Open, he fell in the final round of qualifying to Pablo Cuevas. However, he received entry into the main draw as a lucky loser. He was defeated in the first round by qualifier Jiří Veselý. Ranked 54 at the French Open, he lost in the first round to ninth seed and world No. 11, Denis Shapovalov in four sets.

After the French Open, Simon played at the Bett1Hulks Indoors. He lost in the second round to second seed and world No. 13, Roberto Bautista Agut. At the Bett1Hulks Championship, he upset third seed and world No. 12, Denis Shapovalov, in the second round. He was defeated in the quarterfinals by Italian wildcard Jannik Sinner in three sets, despite winning the second set 6-0. At the Paris Masters, he lost in the first round to Tommy Paul. Simon played his final tournament of the season at the Sofia Open. Getting past qualifying, he was defeated in the second round by sixth seed John Millman.

Simon ended the year ranked 63.

2021: Hiatus, return & continued struggles, Fourth Olympics, Out of top 100
Simon began his 2021 season at the first edition of the Murray River Open. He lost in the second round to Jérémy Chardy. At the Australian Open, he was defeated in the first round by fifth seed and world No. 6, Stefanos Tsitsipas. 

In Montpellier, Simon was eliminated in his first-round match by Dennis Novak. After suffering that first-round defeat, he announced that he would be stepping away from the tour for an undetermined period of time because his heart wasn't in it and also for his Mental health.

Simon returned to action in April at the Sardegna Open. He was beaten in the second round by third seed and eventual champion, Lorenzo Sonego. At the Barcelona Open, he lost in the first round to Pablo Andújar. At the Estoril Open, he fell in the first round to compatriot Pierre-Hugues Herbert. In Lyon, he lost in the first round to Aljaž Bedene. At the first edition of the Emilia-Romagna Open, he was defeated in the first round by qualifier Pedro Martínez. Ranked 69 at the French Open, he lost in the first round to Márton Fucsovics.

2022: French Open & Paris Masters third rounds, 500th career & 300th hard court wins, Retirement
Simon started his 2022 season at the Traralgon International, an ATP Challenger Tour tournament. As the top seed, he reached the quarterfinals but lost to 12th seed Jesper de Jong. At the Australian Open, where he was competing for the 17th time, he fell in the first round of qualifying to Australian Edward Winter. In Montpellier he defeated Lucas Pouille for his 498th match win of his career, after qualifying into the main draw.

He announced his retirement on social media on 7 May 2022 stating that 2022 will be his last year on the tour.

Ranked No. 158, Simon received a wildcard to participate in the main draw at the 2022 French Open for the 17th time in the past 18 years. In the first round he won against World No. 18 and 16 seed Pablo Carreno Busta in a close to a 4 hours five sets match (his 35th of his career) for what was his 499th win on the tour. He went one step further to reach the third round with a defeat over Steve Johnson in straight sets for his 500th career match win. He became the 11th active player to reach this milestone and the 56th overall.
Simon then lost in the third round to Marin Cilic in what was his last match at Roland Garros.

At the 2022 Moselle Open he defeated David Goffin to record his 502th match win and extend his 22–9 winning record in Metz. Ranked No. 195 he received a wildcard to make his 16th appearance in his home tournament, the 2022 Rolex Paris Masters, which was to be the final tournament in his career. He won his first round match defeating former world No. 1 Andy Murray in a close to 3 hours match in three tight sets to earn his 503rd win of his 20-year career. It was his 300th hard court win in his career, making him the 24th man to reach that milestone in the Open Era, and just the 9th active men’s player. In the second round, he managed to beat world No. 11 and ninth seed Taylor Fritz in a three tight sets match that lasted 3 hours and 5 minutes. However, he lost in the round of 16 in his final match to world No. 8 Felix Auger-Aliassime finishing his career inside the top 150.

Coaching team and equipment 
Simon plays with a Head YouTek IG Prestige MP and 2009 Team series bag, both from Head, a brand which he has endorsed.
His racquet is strung with Head IntelliTour 16 String. He is sponsored by Adidas for his clothing.

In September 2012, Simon parted ways with his longtime coach Thierry Tulasne, whom he had worked with since February 2007. He played without a coach prior to adding Étienne Laforgue to his team. His fitness trainer is Paul Quetin.

Significant finals

ATP World Tour Masters 1000 finals

Singles: 2 (2 runners-up)

ATP Tour career finals

Singles: 22 (14 titles, 8 runner-ups)

Doubles: 1 (1 runner-up)

Performance timelines

Singles

Doubles

Record against top 10 players
Simon's match record against those who have been ranked in the top 10, with those who have been No. 1 in boldface

  Janko Tipsarević 9–2
  Gaël Monfils 7–3
  Tomáš Berdych 7–8
  Rainer Schüttler 6–0
  Marin Čilić 6–1
  Fabio Fognini 5–0
  Roberto Bautista Agut 5–3
  Nikolay Davydenko 5–3
  Grigor Dimitrov 5–4
  Lleyton Hewitt 4–0
  Lucas Pouille 4–1
  Jürgen Melzer 4–2
  Juan Mónaco 4–3
  Mikhail Youzhny 4–8
  Ernests Gulbis 3–0
  Daniil Medvedev 3–1
  Nicolás Almagro 3–2
  Marcos Baghdatis 3–3
  David Goffin 3–3
  Pablo Carreño Busta 3–4
  Juan Martín del Potro 3–5
  Stan Wawrinka 3–5
  Jo-Wilfried Tsonga 3–10
  Guillermo Cañas 2–1
  Taylor Fritz 2–1
  Jack Sock 2–1
  Mardy Fish 2–2
  Andy Roddick 2–2
  Radek Štěpánek 2–2
  Ivan Ljubičić 2–3
  Fernando Verdasco 2–3
  Kevin Anderson 2–4
  Robin Söderling 2–5
  Roger Federer 2–7
  David Ferrer 2–8
  Dominic Thiem 2–9
  Andy Murray 2–16
  Jonas Björkman 1–0
  Gastón Gaudio 1–0
  Nicolás Massú 1–0
  Greg Rusedski 1–0
  Matteo Berrettini 1–1
  Thomas Johansson 1–1
  Carlos Moyá 1–1
  Cameron Norrie 1–1
  Mario Ančić 1–2
  James Blake 1–2
  David Nalbandian 1–2
  Denis Shapovalov 1–2
  Karen Khachanov 1–3
  Tommy Haas 1–5
  Milos Raonic 1–5
  Tommy Robredo 1–5
  Richard Gasquet 1–8
  Rafael Nadal 1–8
  Novak Djokovic 1–11
  Fernando González 0–1
  Sébastien Grosjean 0–1
  Nicolas Kiefer 0–1
  Nicolás Lapentti 0–1
  Kei Nishikori 0–1
  Andrey Rublev: 0–1
  Casper Ruud: 0–1
  Jannik Sinner 0–1
  Paradorn Srichaphan 0–1
  Stefanos Tsitsipas 0–1
  Juan Carlos Ferrero 0–2
  Joachim Johansson 0–2
  Diego Schwartzman 0–2
  Félix Auger-Aliassime 0–3
  John Isner 0–3
  Alexander Zverev 0–4

* Statistics correct as of 3 November 2022.

Wins over top 10 players
He has a  record against players who were, at the time the match was played, ranked in the top 10.

ATP career earnings 

* Statistics correct .

Notes

References

External links 

 
 
 

1984 births
Living people
French male tennis players
Olympic tennis players of France
Tennis players at the 2008 Summer Olympics
Tennis players at the 2012 Summer Olympics
Tennis players at the 2016 Summer Olympics
Hopman Cup competitors
Sportspeople from Nice
Sportspeople from Boulogne-Billancourt
People from Neuchâtel
French expatriate sportspeople in Switzerland
Tennis players at the 2020 Summer Olympics